Taboo is a play first performed in 1922, written by Mary Hoyt Wiborg.

It is set on a plantation in Louisiana before the American Civil War and in Africa. It opened on April 4, 1922, in the Sam Harris Theater, Harlem. It starred Margaret Wycherly, the only white member of the cast, Paul Robeson, other African American actors, and African students at Columbia University. An African dance was performed by Columbus Kamba Simango, a Mozambican student at Columbia. This was one of Robeson's first stage opportunities and his performance was praised by critics.

References 

American plays
Harlem Renaissance
Plays set in Louisiana
Plays set in Africa
Plays about race and ethnicity
1922 plays
Paul Robeson